Volleyball was one of the games played at the 1971 Mediterranean Games. Yugoslavia won the men's division .

Medalists

Standings
Men's competition

External links
 Complete 1971 Mediterranean Games Standings

Volleyball at the Mediterranean Games
1971 in volleyball
Volleyball